Liu Li or Li Liu may refer to:

 Li Liu (archaeologist), Chinese archaeologist
 Liu Li (Three Kingdoms) (died 244), prince of the Shu Han state in the Three Kingdoms period
 Li Liu (Cheng Han) (248–303), ruler of the Cheng Han state of the Sixteen Kingdoms
 Liu Li (athlete) (born 1971), Chinese runner
 Liu Li (Paralympian) (born 1986), Chinese Paralympic athlete
 Liu Li (footballer) (born 1997), Chinese association footballer